Castello di Godego is a town and comune with 6,329 inhabitants in the province of Treviso, Italy, Veneto region.

dialetto veneto is spoken by a large community of veneti , tio cà

Historic sites
The remains of the ancient town of Le Motte are on the boundaries with San Martino di Lupari.

Close to the Muson River is one of the area's oldest Catholic churches, San Pietro (4th century BC).

Economy
Aside from agriculture, the most important activities are related to the food sector (Jolly) and the metal and stone machinery sector (Breton S.p.A.).

Twin towns
 Boves, Italy
 Labastide-Saint-Pierre, France

References

Municipalities of the Province of Treviso